RNF216 intronic transcript 1 is a protein encoded by the RNF216-IT1 gene  in humans.

References

Further reading